Paparazzi are photographers who take candid pictures of celebrities.

Paparazzi may also refer to:

Film and television
 Paparazzi (1998 French film), a comedy film directed by Alain Berbérian
 Paparazzi (1998 Italian film), a comedy film directed by Neri Parenti
 Paparazzi (2004 film), an American thriller film directed by Paul Abascal
 Paparazzi: Eye in the Dark, a 2011 Nigerian film directed by Bayo Akinfemi
 Paparazzi (talk show), a 2010–2012 Philippine talk show

Music
 "Paparazzi" (Girls' Generation song), 2012
 "Paparazzi" (Lady Gaga song), 2009
 "Paparazzi" (Xzibit song), 1996
 Paparazzi, an album by Supernova, 2019

Other uses
 Paparazzi!: Tales of Tinseltown, a 1995 video game
 Paparazzi Productions, a 2006–2007 professional wrestling faction
 Paparazzi Project, an open-source autopilot system

See also
 "Poparazzi", a song by Switchfoot from Learning to Breathe